The AEG helicopter was an unusual German aircraft project, intended to create a portable observation post in the form of a tethered helicopter. It achieved lift by use of two contra-rotating rotors powered by an electric motor that was supplied with power from the ground. The device could be folded for transportation on the back of a truck. An observer's cabin was suspended underneath the rotor assembly, and could be blown clear by an explosive charge in case of emergency. Development commenced in 1933, but it was never put into service by the military.

Also, the system was tested to carry an up to 800 m high vlf-antenna for communication to submerged submarines. The 3 power feeder cables doubled as radiators for frequencies  from 15 to 60 kHz.

Specifications (AEG helicopter)

See also

References

Bibliography 
Nowarra, Heinz J.. Die Deutsche Luftrüstung 1933-1945 - Vol.1 - AEG-Dornier. Bernard & Graefe Verlag. 1993. Koblenz.  (Gesamtwerk),  (Band 1)
Helmut Maier. Rüstungsforschung im Nationalsozialismus: Organisation, Mobilisierung und Entgrenzung der Technikwissenschaften. Wallstein Verlag. 2002. Page 134.

Helicopter
1930s German military reconnaissance aircraft
Military helicopters
1930s German helicopters
Abandoned military aircraft projects of Germany
Electric helicopters